Miss World Puerto Rico or Miss Mundo de Puerto Rico is a national Beauty pageant that selects Puerto Rico's representative to the Miss World pageant.

History
Puerto Rico debuted in Miss World in 1959, then was absent from 1960 to 1969. In 1970 a new organization took the responsibility of sending contestants until 1985 via castings. Puerto Rico did not compete in Miss World from 1986 to 1988. The Miss Puerto Rico organization, directed by Anna Santisteban, obtained the Miss World franchise in 1989, Tania Collazo was her first Miss World delegate. Santisteban produced Miss World PR until 1995.

In 1996, Delia Cruz, mother of  Miss World Wilnelia Merced Cruz, obtained the franchise and began organizing the Miss Mundo de Puerto Rico pageant with Tania Collazo as organizer for a few years before Desiree Lowry and later on Shanira Blanco. Winners have been competing ever since in the international pageant. Puerto Rico has produced two winners (1975,2016), two 2nd runners-up (2005, 2011) and ten semi-finalists (1976, 1978, 1980, 1985, 2002, 2003, 2006, 2007, 2008, 2010), and three quarter-finalists (2012, 2019, 2021).

In 2017, due to the devastating effects of two hurricanes that heavily ravaged the entire island within a week, the organizers of Miss World Puerto Rico decided not to send the country's representative in this year's Miss World. No delegate was appointed due to lack of funding and sponsorship.

Representatives 
The Miss World pageant began in 1951, and since then Puerto Rico has had 16 representatives classify in the finals including: 2 winners, 2 runners-up, 10 semi-finalists and 2 quarter-finalists.

Color key

Winners' gallery

See also
Miss Puerto Rico

References

External links
 Nuestra Belleza Latina
 Por La Corona

Beauty pageants in Puerto Rico
Puerto Rico